David Dawson Cosgrove (born April 1960) is an Irish businessman whose Belvedere Management group claimed to have $16 billion of assets under administration. In 2016 he was barred from serving as an officer of any company regulated by the  Mauritius Financial Services Commission (FSC) for a period of 5 years and the funds he managed were liquidated.

Belvedere Management
Cosgrove was the founder of the Belvedere Management group which claimed to have $16 billion of assets under administration. The group reportedly ran125 hedge funds and has numerous subsidiaries active in fund administration, life insurance, stock broking, and investment management.

Other company appointments
According to the listing document produced when Fulhold Pharma plc applied to have its shares admitted to the GXG Market in Denmark, as of 1 July 2014 Cosgrove was a director of over 70 companies located in Mauritius, Guernsey, Switzerland, Jersey, Seychelles, British Virgin Islands, Gibraltar, the Cayman Islands and the United Kingdom.

Residence
Cosgrove worked from Mauritius where he managed the business of Belvedere, but also had a home in South Africa where he also lived and where much of the firm's business was done.

See also
Cobus Kellermann
Kenneth Maillard

References

Living people
Irish business executives
1960 births
Irish expatriates in South Africa